The Nurol Ejder (lit. "Dragon") is a family of armoured vehicles produced by Turkish company Nurol Makina. Two versions exists under the Ejder name, a 6x6 version, and a more popular 4x4 version, called Ejder Yalcin.

Variants

Ejder 6×6 Armoured Combat Vehicle 
Baseline 6×6 version is fitted with a remotely controlled 7.62 mm caliber machine gun and 40mm automatic grenade launcher. Supports integration of various weapon systems and armed turrets weighted up to 5 tons. V-shaped hull for improved protection against landmines and IEDs. It can withstand the blast from an 8 kg mine. Protection can be enhanced with modular add-on armor.

A number of these vehicles were sold to Georgia in 2008.

Ejder Yalçın 4×4 Armoured Combat Vehicle 

Design studies on the vehicle were initiated in the last quarter of 2012 and a pre-prototype of the base vehicle was exhibited at the IDEF in 2013. Mass production of the vehicle began in May 2014.

It features a V-shaped hull design, integrating floating floor plates and blast mitigation seating to provide protection against mines and IED's. It can accommodate up to 11 personnel and can carry a payload of up to 4 tons.

The vehicle is equipped with optionally integrated, remote-controlled and manually-operated weapon stations. It is fitted with two gun ports on the roof. The optional armament mounted on the vehicle includes 7.62mm and 12.7mm machine guns, a 25mm anti-aircraft gun and a 40mm automatic grenade launcher.

Versions

Both vehicles can be configured to be used in a variety of roles including:
 Personnel carrier
 Reconnaissance
 Nuclear, biological and chemical warfare
 Fire support
 ATGM carrier
 IFV
 Mortar
 Command
 Recovery
 Medical evacuation
 Engineering

Operators

Ejder 6×6 current operators 
  – 90

Ejder Yalçın 4×4 current operators 
 
  – 10 – 40 more on order. A derivative of this vehicle is planned to be put into production in Hungary known as Gidran (4x4 armored vehicle).
  – National Gendarmerie: 25 purchased in February 2018, first deliveries expected in March 2018.
  – 20 on order.
  – 71
  – 400
  – 1,024 on order
  – 342 on order

Ejder Yalçın 4×4 potential operators 
  – Morocco has expressed interest to purchase the Yalcin.

References

Wheeled armoured personnel carriers
Amphibious armoured personnel carriers
Armoured fighting vehicles of Turkey
Motor vehicles manufactured in Turkey
Six-wheeled vehicles
Military vehicles introduced in the 2000s
Wheeled amphibious armoured fighting vehicles